"Live and Let Die" is the theme song of the 1973 James Bond film of the same name, performed by the British–American rock band Wings. Written by English musician Paul McCartney and his wife Linda McCartney, it reunited McCartney with former Beatles producer George Martin, who produced the song and arranged the orchestra. McCartney was contacted to write the song by the film's producers Harry Saltzman and Albert R. Broccoli before the screenplay was finished. Wings recorded "Live and Let Die" during the sessions for Red Rose Speedway in October 1972 at AIR Studios. It was also the first rock song to open a Bond film. Another version by B. J. Arnau also appears in the film.

Upon release, "Live and Let Die" was the most successful Bond theme up to that point, reaching No. 1 on two of the three major US charts (though it only reached No. 2 on the Billboard Hot 100) and No. 9 on the UK Singles Chart. The song also received positive reviews from music critics and continues to be praised as one of McCartney's best songs. It became the first Bond theme song to be nominated for the Academy Award for Best Original Song, but ultimately lost the award to Barbra Streisand's "The Way We Were". It won the Best Arrangement Accompanying Vocalist(s) at the 16th Annual Grammy Awards in 1974.

Wings performed "Live and Let Die" live during their concert tours and McCartney continues to play it on his solo tours, often using pyrotechnics during the instrumental breaks. It has been covered by several bands, including Guns N' Roses, whose version appears on their 1991 album Use Your Illusion I. One of the more popular covers of the song, their version was nominated for the Grammy Award for Best Hard Rock Performance at the 35th Annual Grammy Awards in 1993. In 2012, McCartney was awarded the Million-Air Award from Broadcast Music, Inc. (BMI), for more than 4 million performances of the song in the US.

Background and recording
Even before Tom Mankiewicz had finished writing the screenplay to Live and Let Die, producers Harry Saltzman and Albert R. Broccoli invited McCartney to write the theme song. McCartney asked to be sent a copy of Ian Fleming's novel. "I read it and thought it was pretty good. That afternoon I wrote the song and went in the next week and did it ... It was a job of work for me in a way because writing a song around a title like that's not the easiest thing going."

Originally, Saltzman was interested in having Shirley Bassey or Thelma Houston perform it instead of Wings. Martin said McCartney would allow the song to be used in the movie only if Wings was able to perform the song in the opening credits. The recording contract specified that McCartney would "perform the title song under the opening titles".

A second version of the song, performed by B. J. Arnau, also appears in the film. Arnau's performance originally was meant for the group Fifth Dimension. The Arnau version of the song appears on the soundtrack album as a component in a medley that also contains two George Martin-composed instrumental pieces, "Fillet of Soul – New Orleans" and "Fillet of Soul – Harlem". It was also released by RCA Records as a single in late June 1973.

Wings recorded "Live and Let Die" during the sessions for the Red Rose Speedway album, in October 1972. The song was recorded at AIR Studios, with Ray Cooper providing percussion instruments.

Release and aftermath
"Live and Let Die" was previewed in the 1973 television special James Paul McCartney, which aired on 16 April in the United States and 10 May in the United Kingdom. In the segment, McCartney and Wings were shown performing the song in his studio, while clips of the film were shown, before the film's US theatrical release on 27 June. In his contemporary review of the single for the NME, Ian MacDonald wrote: "McCartney's fairly reasonable solution to the given problem 'Write, in less than 25 bars, a theme-tune for the new James Bond movie' is to 'Let It Be' for the first half, wailing absently and with a curious notion of grammar, about this 'ever changing world in which we live in', before sitting back to let a 3,000-piece orchestra do a man-in-the-street's impression of John Barry. It's not intrinsically very interesting, but the film will help to sell it and vice versa." Billboard's contemporary review called it "the best 007 movie theme" to that time and one of McCartney's most satisfying singles, by combining sweet melody, symphonic bombast and some reggae into one song. Cash Box said that the song was "absolutely magnificent in every respect". 

"Live and Let Die" reached No. 1 on two of the three major US charts, though only reached No. 2 on the US Hot 100 for three weeks. It was kept from the No. 1 spot each week by three different songs, "The Morning After" by Maureen McGovern, "Touch Me in the Morning" by Diana Ross, and "Brother Louie" by Stories. "Live and Let Die" also peaked at No. 9 in the UK. The single was certified Gold by the Recording Industry Association of America for sales of over one million copies. 

Sales of the single release and of the sheet music were "solid." The sheet music used the line "in this ever-changing world in which we live in" as part of the opening verse of the song. In the Washington Post interview more than 30 years later, McCartney told the interviewer, "I don't think about the lyric when I sing it. I think it's 'in which we're living', or it could be 'in which we live in', and that's kind of, sort of, wronger but cuter," before deciding that it was "in which we're living". 

"Live and Let Die" was not featured on a McCartney album until the Wings Greatest compilation in 1978, and was included again on 1987's All the Best!, 2001's Wingspan: Hits and History, 2016's Pure McCartney, and in 2018 as a restored bonus track on a reissue of Red Rose Speedway. The entire soundtrack also was released in quadrophonic. It was also included on The 7" Singles Box in 2022.

United Artists promoted the song in trade advertisements for Academy Award consideration, though producer Broccoli opposed the marketing tactic as unnecessary. The song became the first James Bond theme song to be nominated for an Academy Award for Best Original Song (garnering McCartney his second Academy Award nomination and Linda her first). In the Academy Award performance of the song, entertainer Connie Stevens dressed in a "silver-lamé outfit" with a Native American-looking headdress "descended from the ceiling" and then was "variously lifted and tossed about" by dancers dressed in various colours until she left the scene. The song lost to the eponymous theme song from the musical film The Way We Were. 

In Wings' live performances of the song, the instrumental break featured flashpots and a laser light show. McCartney has continued to play the song on his solo tours, often using pyrotechnics. "Live and Let Die" is the only song to appear on all of McCartney's live albums (except for the acoustic-based Unplugged). 

Following the 9/11 attacks, the song was placed on Clear Channels list of inappropriate song titles. 

The song with an extended introduction was included in the movie Shrek The Third (2007) and on its soundtrack. It was also used to underscore the montage celebrating the 60th anniversary of the James Bond franchise, as presented at the 94th Academy Awards in 2022.

Personnel
Paul McCartney – lead vocals, piano
Linda McCartney – backing vocals, keyboard
Denny Laine – backing vocals, bass guitar 
Henry McCullough – lead guitar
Denny Seiwell – drums
Ray Cooper – percussion
George Martin – orchestral arrangement

Charts

Weekly charts

Year-end charts

Certifications

Unreleased "Weird Al" Yankovic parody

In 1984, McCartney asked "Weird Al" Yankovic when he was going to parody one of his songs. In 1992, Yankovic asked for permission to put his parody "Chicken Pot Pie" on an album. McCartney denied the use because he is a vegetarian and did not want to promote the consumption of meat. Yankovic, a vegetarian himself, said he respected the decision; however, he has performed the song live in the 1990s as part of a food-themed medley.

Guns N' Roses version

American rock band Guns N' Roses covered "Live and Let Die" in 1991. It was released as the second single from their 1991 album, Use Your Illusion I, and the fourth out of all the Use Your Illusion singles. This cover was commercially successful and was nominated for the Grammy Award for Best Hard Rock Performance at the 35th Annual Grammy Awards in 1993.

Background
In the April 1992 issue of Guitar for the Practicing Musician, Slash explained to John Stix how the group came to record the song:

In his 2007 memoir, Slash credits Rose for his synthesizer work on the track, writing, "When we did 'Live and Let Die', it was all synths – those horns are not horns. What Axl did there was really complex; he spent hours dialing all that shit in, getting the nuances just right, and I have to give him that."

Chart performance
Guns N' Roses' cover charted at No. 20 on the US Billboard Album Rock Tracks chart and No. 33 on the Billboard Hot 100. Worldwide, the single reached the top five in Ireland, Norway, and the United Kingdom. In Finland, it became the third consecutive number-one single from the Use Your Illusion albums, and it also reached No. 1 in New Zealand for two weeks.

Music video
A music video was made in November 1991 featuring the band playing live on stage and showing old pictures. The video also was made shortly before Izzy Stradlin's departure, and it is the last video in which he appears.

In popular culture
Guns N' Roses' version of this song appears on the soundtrack of the 1997 movie Grosse Pointe Blank.

All proceeds from sales of the t-shirt were donated to the Recording Academy's MusiCares, which provides services and resources to those in need in the music community.

Track listing
 "Live and Let Die" – 2:59
 "Live and Let Die"  – 3:37
 "Shadow of Your Love"  – 2:50

Personnel
Guns N' Roses
 W. Axl Rose – lead vocals, keyboard, programming, backing vocals
 Slash – lead guitar, 6-string bass
 Izzy Stradlin – rhythm guitar
 Duff McKagan – bass
 Matt Sorum – drums
 Dizzy Reed – keyboards
Additional musicians
 Shannon Hoon – backing vocals
 Johann Langlie – programming
 Jon Trautwein – horn 
 Matthew McKagan – horn
 Rachel West – horn
 Robert Clark – horn

Charts

Weekly charts

Year-end charts

Certifications

Release history

See also
 Outline of James Bond

References

General
 

1970s ballads
1973 singles
1991 singles
Apple Records singles
Cashbox number-one singles
Geffen Records singles
Grammy Award for Best Instrumental Arrangement Accompanying Vocalist(s)
Guns N' Roses songs
Live and Let Die (film)
Music published by MPL Music Publishing
Number-one singles in Finland
Number-one singles in New Zealand
Paul McCartney and Wings songs
Paul McCartney songs
Rock ballads
Song recordings produced by George Martin
Songs from James Bond films
Songs written by Linda McCartney
Songs written by Paul McCartney
Symphonic rock songs